A flooded mine is one of the direct results of a mine's closure procedure. When a mine stops operating, its maintenance systems also stop, in which the dewatering systems are included. Without these systems the mine will get flooded by water that naturally occurs in rock formations in the ground.

Overview

Mining operations can occur over a long period of time, from several years to several decades, and in order to keep the mining operations running, water has to be removed from the mine as it accumulates. After the mine is closed, when its operational life ends, the maintenance systems stop, including the dewatering systems. Without dewatering, the mines tend to flood with surface and groundwaters in the lower levels and mined spaces, if there is not a drainage adit present. The flooding process of an open-pit or underground mine can take from a several months period to more than a decade, depending on factors such as volume of open space in the mine, availability of infiltration water and on the nature of flooding - it can be uncontrolled, controlled or monitored.

Open pit mines

Flooding in open pit mines leads to the so-called pit lakes, where a wide range of creatures can be seen. The flooding process happens because the drainage wells or dewatering pumps are stopped and the open spaces are filled with groundwater and surface runoff from precipitation and water bodies (e.g. rivers). Waters quality in flooded open pit mines can range from drinking water quality to acidic waters that can kill animals if drunk.

Underground mines

Flooding in underground mines is usually controlled. These types of mines are not directly influenced by surface waters, so it is mainly underground water that plays a role in the flooding. One of the main reasons to let an underground mine be flooded is to avoid disulfide oxidation, and thus avoid acid mine drainage. Other important reason is safety: people coming to underground mines without safety precautions or the presence of dangerous mine gases.

The controlled flooding of underground mines usually follows these guidelines:

 Removal of potential water hazards
 Fill the surfaces that might collapse during or after the flooding process
 Install water diversion systems
 Install, at both the surface and underground, a system to monitor hydrogeological and geotechnical aspects
 Make a projection of hydrological and hydrogeochemical development of mine waters

Reasons for mine flooding

There are a wide range of factors that lead to mine flooding. Six of those main reasons are:

 The mine ceases to be economically important
 Depletion of raw materials
 Political reasons, war or accidents
 Instability of the mine workings
 Prevention of disulfide oxidation
 Safety reasons

In some locations, flooded mines have been converted into pumped-storage hydroelectric reservoirs.

Historical mine flooding disasters

 Chasnala mine
 Quecreek Mine
 Wangjialing mine
 Knox Mine
 Milford Mine
 Luotuoshan mine
 Jiangjiawan Mine

References

Mining